The Star Theatre is a historic Streamline Modern/Art Deco theatre in the inner Launceston suburb of Invermay, Tasmania. When it opened in 1937, the theatre provided seating for 852 persons. The cinema was purchased in 1971 by the St. Vincent de Paul Society as a charity store after the theatre originally closed in 1969.

Andrew Quaile, Ben Davis and Paul Lee-Archer purchased the property in 2015, restoring it to an independent cinema, café and bar. The cinema re-opened on 6 April 2018. In 2022, it was purchased by Michael Smith, proprietor of the Sun Theatre in Yarraville, Victoria, Australia.

External links

References

Further reading
 

Art Deco architecture in Tasmania
Theatres completed in 1937
Cinemas in Launceston
Buildings and structures in Launceston, Tasmania
Former theatres in Tasmania
Streamline Moderne Cinemas
Tasmanian Heritage Register
Former cinemas